The Ainu in Russia are an indigenous people of Siberia located in Sakhalin Oblast, Khabarovsk Krai and Kamchatka Krai. The Russian Ainu people (Aine), also called Kurile (курилы, kurily), Kamchatka's Kurile (камчатские курилы, kamchatskiye kurily / камчадальские айны, kamchadalskiye ayny) or Eine (эйны, eyny), can be subdivided into six groups.

Although only around 100 people currently identify themselves as Ainu in Russia (according to the census of 2010), it is believed that at least 1,000 people are of significant Ainu ancestry. The low numbers identifying as Ainu are a result of the refusal by the government of the Russian Federation to recognise the Ainu as a "living" ethnic group. Most of the people who identify themselves as Ainu live in Kamchatka Krai, although the largest number of people who are of Ainu ancestry (without acknowledging it) are found in Sakhalin Oblast. Many local people are ethnically Ainu or have significant Ainu ancestry but identify as Russian or Nivkh and speak Russian as mother tongue, often not knowing about their Ainu ancestry.

History

Ainu trading expeditions with the Kamchatka Peninsula and other northern regions which today are part of Russia began very early on, despite the traditionally sedentary customs of Ainu society. Ainu migrations to Kamchatka and the Amur River area from Hokkaido were increasingly limited after the 16th century however, as Japanese merchants and officials increasingly limited their ability to migrate.

The Kamchatka Ainu first came into contact with Russian fur traders by the end of the 17th century. Contact with the Amur Ainu and North Kuril Ainu were established during the 18th century. By mid-18th century more than 1,500 Ainu had accepted Russian citizenship.

The Ainu (especially those in the Kuriles) supported the Russians over the Japanese in conflicts of the 19th century. However, after their defeat during the Russo-Japanese War of 1905, the Russians abandoned their allies and left them to their fate. Hundreds of Ainu were executed and their families were forcibly relocated to Hokkaido by the Japanese. As a result, the Russians failed to win over the Ainu during World War II.

Resettlement in Kamchatka
As a result of the Treaty of St. Petersburg, the Kurile islands were surrendered to the Japanese, along with the Ainu inhabitants. A total of 83 North Kurile Ainu arrived in Petropavlovsk-Kamchatsky on September 18, 1877, after they decided to remain under Russian rule. They refused the offer by Russian officials to move to new reservations in the Commander Islands. An agreement was reached in 1881 and the Ainu chose to settle in the village of Yavin. In March 1881, the group left Petropavlovsk and began the long journey to Yavin by foot. Four months later, they reached their new homes. Another village, Golygino, was founded later. Nine more Ainu arrived from Japan in 1884. According to the 1897 Census of Russia, Golygino had a population of 57 (all Ainu) and Yavin a population of 39 (33 Ainu & 6 Russian). However, under Soviet rule both villages were abolished and inhabitants forcibly moved to the ethnic Russian-dominated Zaporozhye settlement in Ust-Bolsheretsky Raion. As a result of intermarriage, the ethnic groups assimilated to form the Kamchadal community.

During the Tsarist period, the Ainu living in Russia were forbidden to identify themselves by that name, since the Japanese officials claimed that all areas inhabited by the Ainu in the past or present belonged to Japan. The Ainu were referred to as "Kurile", "Kamchatka Kurile" or simply as Russian. As a result, many Ainu changed their surnames to Slavic sounding ones.

On 7 February 1953, K. Omelchenko, the Soviet Minister of the Protection of Military and State Secrets banned the press from publishing any information on the Ainu still living in the USSR. The order was finally revoked after two decades.

Recent History
The North Kurile Ainu of Zaporozhye are the largest Ainu subgroup remaining in Russia. The Nakamura clan (South Kuril Ainu on the paternal side) are the smallest and number just 6 individuals who live in Petropavlovsk. There are several dozen people on Sakhalin Island who identify themselves as Sakhalin Ainu, but many more have unacknowledged partial Ainu ancestry. Most of the 888 Japanese who live in Russian territory (2010 Census) are of mixed Japanese and Ainu ancestry, though they generally do not claim it, since full Japanese ancestry gives them the right of visa-free entry to Japan. Similarly, no one identifies as Amur Valley Ainu, even though people with partial descent are known to exist in Khabarovsk. It is thought that no living descendants of the Kamchatka Ainu remain today.

In 1979, the USSR removed the term "Ainu" from the list of living ethnic groups of Russia, the government proclaiming that the Ainu as an ethnic group was now extinct in its territory. According to the 2002 Russian Federation census, no one marked the Ainu option in boxes 7 or 9.2 in the K-1 form.

The Ainu emphasize that they are the original inhabitants of the Kurile islands and that both the Japanese and Russians were invaders.

In 2004, the small Ainu community living in Kamchatka Krai wrote to Vladimir Putin, urging him to reconsider any move to return the Southern Kurile islands to Japan. They criticized the Japanese, the Tsarist Russians, and the Soviets for crimes against the Ainu, including killings and forced assimilation. They urged him to recognize the Japanese genocide against the Ainu people, which Putin refused to do. 
During the 2010 Census of Russia, almost 100 people tried to register themselves as ethnic Ainu, but the governing council of Kamchatka Krai refused to do so and enrolled them as ethnic Kamchadal. In 2011, the leader of the Ainu community in Kamchatka, Alexei Vladimirovich Nakamura requested that Vladimir Ilyukhin (Governor of Kamchatka) and Boris Nevzorov (Chairman of state Duma) include the Ainu in the central list of Indigenous small-numbered peoples of the North, Siberia and the Far East. This was also turned down.

Ethnic Ainu living in Sakhalin Oblast and Khabarovsk Krai are not politically  organized. According to Alexei Nakamura, as of 2012, there were only 205 Ainu living in Russia (up from just 12 people who self-identified as Ainu in 2008) and they, with the Kurile Kamchadals (Itelmen of Kuril Islands), are fighting for official recognition. Since the Ainu are not recognized in the official list of ethnic groups living in Russia, they are either counted as people without nationality or as ethnic Russian, Nivkh or Kamchadal.

As of 2012, both the Kurile Ainu and Kurile Kamchadal ethnic groups do not have the fishing and hunting rights the Russian government grants to other indigenous tribal communities of the far north.

The Ainu have now formed a Russian Association of the Far-Eastern Ainu (RADA) under Rechkabo Kakukhoningen (Boris Yaravoy).

In March 2017, Alexei Nakamura revealed that plans for an Ainu village to be created in Petropavlovsk-Kamchatsky, and plans for an Ainu dictionary are underway.

Demographics 

According to the Russian Census (2010), a total of 109 Ainu live in Russia. Of this, 94 lived in Kamchatka Krai, 4 in Primorye, 3 in Sakhalin, 1 in Khabarovsk, 4 in Moscow, 1 in St.Petersburg, 1 in Sverdlovsk, and 1 in Rostov. The real population is believed to be much higher, as hundreds of Ainu in Sakhalin refused to identify themselves as such. Additionally many local people are ethnically Ainu or have significant Ainu ancestry, but identify as various recognized groups, such as Nivkhs and speak Russian as mother tongue, often not knowing about their Ainu ancestry.

Ainu of Sakhalin
During the Tsarist times, the Ainu living in Russia were forbidden from identifying themselves as such, as the Imperial Japanese officials had claimed that all the regions inhabited by the Ainu in the past or present, are a part of Japan. The terms "Kurile", "Kamchatka Kurile" or simply Russian, etc. were used to identify the ethnic group. As a result, large number of Ainu changed their surnames to Slavic ones. To eradicate the Ainu identity, the Soviet authorities removed the ethnic group from the list of nationalities which can be mentioned in the passport, as they feared the Ainu as possible Japanese spies. Due to this, children born after 1945 were not able to identify themselves as Ainu.

After World War II, many of the Ainu living in Sakhalin were deported to Japan. Out of the 1,159 known Ainu, only around 100 remained in Russia. Of those who remained, only the elderly were full blooded Ainu. Others were either mixed race, married to ethnic Russians or self-identified as Russian. The last of the official Ainu households disappeared in the late 1960s, when Yamanaka Kitaro committed suicide after the death of his wife. The couple was childless.

Ainu of Ust-Bolsheretsky
Out of a total of 826 people living in the village of Zaporozhye in Ust-Bolsheretsky District, more than 100 people claimed during the 2010 Census that they are Ainu. They are former residents of the liquidated villages Yavin and Golygino. The number of people with Ainu ancestry is estimated to be many times this amount, but in general, there is reluctance from the individuals themselves and from the census takers to record the nationality as "Ainu" (although not on a scale which is seen in Sakhalin). The majority of the population in Zaporozhye refers themselves as either Kamchadal (a term used for the Ainu to refer to them without acknowledging their ethnic Ainu identity and other native groups) or Russian, rather than identifying with either of the two native ethnic groups (Ainu and Itelmen). Although identifying as Itelmen can give additional benefits (hunting and fishing rights), the residents seems to be wary about ethnic polarization and response from full-blooded Russian neighbors. Identifying as Ainu is not beneficial in any way. As an unrecognized nation, the Ainu are not eligible for either fishing or hunting quotas.

Families who are the descended from Kuril Ainu include Butin (Бутины), Storozhev (Сторожевы),  Ignatiev (Игнатьевы), Merlin (Мерлины), Konev (Коневы), Lukaszewski (Лукашевские), and Novograblenny (Новограбленные) among other unknown ones.

Ainu of Clan Nakamura
Unlike the other Ainu clans currently living in Russia, there is considerable doubt whether the Nakamura clan of Kamchatka should be identified as Northern Kurils Ainu, Southern Kurils Ainu or as Kamchatka Ainu. This is due to the fact that the clan originally immigrated to Kamchatka from Kunashir in 1789. The Ainu of Kunashir are South Kurils Ainu. They settled down near Kurile Lake, which was inhabited by the Kamchatka Ainu and North Kuril Ainu. In 1929, the Ainu of Kurile Lake fled to the island of Paramushir after an armed conflict with the Soviet authorities. At that time, Paramushir was under Japanese rule. During the Invasion of the Kuril Islands, Akira Nakamura (b. 1897) was captured by the Soviet army and his elder son Takeshi Nakamura (1925–1945) was killed in the battle. Akira's only surviving son, Keizo (b. 1927) was taken prisoner and joined the Soviet Army after his capture. After the war, Keizo went to Korsakov to work in the local harbor. In 1963, he married Tamara Pykhteeva, a member of the Sakhalin Ainu tribe. Their only child, Alexei was born in 1964. The descendants of Tamara and Alexei are found in Kamchatka and Sakhalin.

The last known deportation of Ainu to Japan occurred in 1982, when Keizo Nakamura, a full blooded Southern Kurils Ainu was deported to Hokkaido after serving 15 years hard labor in the province of Magadan. His wife, Tamara Timofeevna Pykhteeva was of mixed Sakhalin Ainu and Gilyak ancestry. After the arrest of Keizo in 1967, Tamara and her son Alexei Nakamura were expelled from Kamchatka Krai and sent to the island of Sakhalin, to live in the city of Tomari.

Ainu of Komandorski Islands
In 1877, the Badaev (Бадаев) family split from the rest of Northern Kuril Ainu and decided to settle in the Commander Islands, along with the Aleut. They were assimilated by the Aleut and currently identify themselves as Aleut. Two of the families residing there are believed to be of partial Ainu ancestry: the Badaevs and the Kuznetsovs.

Commander Islands was originally designated as a refuge for the Aleut people (from Atka, Attu, Fox, Andreanof.etc.), who were forced to flee Alaska after Russia sold it to the US. In 1827, on Bering Island lived 110 people (of which 93 spoke either Aleut or Aleut-Russian creole). Since the Northern Kuril Ainu were also having similar problems, the Tsar hoped to resettle them near the Aleut. But the Ainu were skeptical of the offer and rejected it, as they wanted to stay in Kamchatka mainland, whose geography was familiar to them. Only one Ainu family moved to the island, and were joined by ethnic Russians, Kamchadals, Itelmen, Kadyaktsy (Kodiak Island Eskimo), Creoles (mixed origin people]]), Komi-Zyrians and Roma.

By 1879, the island was home to a total of 168 Aleut and 332 Creole, plus around 50 to 60 people from other nationalities including the Ainu and Russian. All the Creole spoke the Aleut language, as it was the language of their mothers. The Ainu, along with other minorities were quickly assimilated by the Aleut within a few decades.

Federal recognition

According to the Census authority of Russian Federation, the Ainu are extinct as an ethnic group in Russia. Those who identify as Ainu, neither speak the Ainu language, nor practice any aspect of the traditional Ainu culture. In social behavior and customs, they are almost identical with the Old Russian settlers of Kamchatka and therefore the benefits which are given to the Itelmen cannot be given to the Ainu of Kamchatka.
 
The Ainu language is extinct as a spoken language in Russia. The Bolsheretsky Kurile stopped using the language as early as the beginning of the 20th century. Only 3 fluent speakers remained in Sakhalin as of 1979, and the language was extinct by the 1980s there. Although Keizo Nakamura was a fluent speaker of Kurile Ainu and translated several documents from the language to Russian for the NKVD, he did not pass on the language to his son. (Take Asai, the last speaker of Sakhalin Ainu, died in Japan in 1994.)

See also
Ainu flag

Further reading

References

Ethnic groups in Siberia
Sakhalin Oblast
Russia
Ainu